Gaetano Gariboldi (November 8, 1815 – July 11, 1857) was an Italian painter, active in a painting landscapes.

He was born in Milan, and died there. He was enrolled in the academy under Luigi Sabatelli, but preferred painting landscapes in the style of Giuseppe Bisi.

Sources

1815 births
1857 deaths
19th-century Italian painters
19th-century Italian male artists
Italian male painters
Italian landscape painters
Painters from Milan
Painters from Bergamo